Malacañang sa Sugbo was the official residence of the President of the Philippines in the Visayas. It is located in Cebu City near the Port Area and Fort San Pedro, and within walking distance from the Basilica Menor del Santo Niño, Magellan's Cross, and City Hall. It is named after the Malacañang Palace, the official residence of the President in the capital city of Manila.

History

Previously known as the Aduana (Customs) building, it was originally built in 1910 to house the Bureau of Customs (BOC) office in the Port of Cebu City. It was designed by William E. Parsons who was assigned as the architect of the Philippine Government from (1905–1914).  Parsons was chosen by Daniel H. Burnham to execute the plans for the city of Manila and Baguio.  Parsons made his own plan for the development of the city of Cebu and the Customs Office is the first building constructed according to his plan.

The building continued as the Customs office until 2004, when President Gloria Macapagal Arroyo converted the structure into Malacañang sa Sugbo. The Aduana was restored by the national government at a cost of ₱700,000.  The Bureau of Customs was forced out of the building, and moved to a rented building from the Cebu Ports Authority (CPA).

In July 2012, the Bureau of Customs was trying to repossess and return to the Aduana after the building they were housed in, suffered damages from an earthquake on February 6, 2012.  Huge cracks on the ceiling, floor, and interior walls were noticed on the building after the temblor. The Aduana, which is still owned by the BOC, was not being used and is seen by the Customs office as a "white elephant." Michael Rama, Mayor of Cebu, wanted to preserve the building as Malacañang sa Sugbo for its historical value as the symbolic seat of the Presidency in the south, and as a tourist attraction.

In 2013, the Malacañang sa Sugbo building has been cordoned off and declared off-limits after structural engineers of the Cebu City's Department of Engineering and Public Works determined it had been rendered unsafe by the October 15 earthquake. The building was reopened on  July 19, 2016, for inspection and ongoing assessment to identify the repairs it needed and to determine how much will be spent. Presidential Assistant for the Visayas (PAV) Michael Dino holds office in the room at the left wing of the building as the PAV office.

In 2018, the Cebu Port Authority (CPA) has requested President Rodrigo Duterte to return the road and the berthing area at the back of the Malacañang sa Sugbo. CPA General Manager Angelo Verdan said a member of the Cebu Port Commission, the policy-making body of CPA, brought their letter to newly appointed Cabinet Secretary Karlo Nograles to facilitate their request. They want Nograles to forward the letter to the President after the Office of the Presidential Assistant for the Visayas failed to do so. The berthing area, he said, can ease the congestion at the port and the roads can decongest the traffic around the area. In can be recalled that the declaration of Malacañang sa Sugbo by then President Gloria Macapagal Arroyo in 2005 includes the occupation of the port road which was regularly used by truckers and motorists and the berthing area was used by shipping lines. However, the building, the road, and the port were left idle. The closure of the road also caused traffic, especially at the nearby Pier 1 because trucks have to U-turn instead of proceeding to M.J. Cuenco Avenue as the exit.  However, Verdan said that they are only interested in the port and not the building, in which  under the law, BOC owns the building, while the CPA is the owner of the road and the berthing area.

In 2019, the Cebu Port Authority (CPA) will soon open to traffic the road behind Malacañang sa Sugbo to decongest the area from Pier 1 to the viaduct leading to South Road Properties (SRP). The CPA also wants to convert the berthing area behind Malacañang sa Sugbo into a docking area for international cruise ships to promote tourism.  Executive Secretary Salvador Medialdea officially returned the century-old building of the Bureau of Customs (BOC) after the Malacañang sa Sugbo office was dissolved. However, there was no mention of whether the berthing area would be returned to the CPA.

Personnel of the Bureau of Customs – Port of Cebu will be transferred back to the old Customs house.  Customs Commissioner Rey Leonardo Guerrero is determined to repossess the old building which used to be the customs clearinghouse of the port. Presidential Security Group (PSG)  stationed in the Malacañang sa Sugbo were ordered to vacate the property, in preparation for the repair of the edifice. A letter signed by PSG chief, Col. Jose Eriel Niembra, informed Guerrero that they have pulled out their Cebu contingent housed in the Malacañang sa Sugbo and the letter also stated that the President approved the same effective 31 October 2018. The agency's central office will subject the old Customs building to a major rehabilitation. However, the old Customs house could no longer accommodate all 19 divisions and sections now occupying its existing office at the Cebu International Port (CIP) complex in Pier 6.

See also
Malacañang of the South, the official residence of the President of the Philippines in Mindanao
The Mansion, Baguio, the official summer residence of the President of the Philippines

References

Further reading
The Work of William E. Parsons in the Philippine Islands, Part I from Architectural Record, Volume 41, pp. 305–324.
The Work of William E. Parsons in the Philippine Islands, Part II from Architectural Record, Volume 41, pp. 423–434.

External links
Malacañan sa Sugbo photo

Buildings and structures in Cebu City
Landmarks in the Philippines
Official residences in the Philippines
Palaces in the Philippines